Ivan Valeryevich Montik (Russian: Иван Валерьевич Монтик, born January 29, 1982) is a Belarusian businessperson who co-founded software company Softswiss.

Montik was born in Minsk, Belarus and initially studied Applied Mathematics and Computer Science, before switching to International Management (Faculty of Economics).

In 2020, Montik and Softswiss relocated from Belarus to Ukraine.

References 

1982 births
Living people